Stephanie Anne "Steve" Chadwick  (née Frizzell, born 15 December 1948) is a New Zealand politician. She served as mayor of Rotorua from 2013 to 2022. She previously held the positions of Minister of Conservation, Women's Affairs, and Associate Health in the Fifth Labour Government of New Zealand.

Early life
Born Stephanie Frizzell in Hastings, New Zealand, Chadwick is the sister of painter Dick Frizzell. She attended Karamu High School, then did nursing training in Wellington. She married lawyer John Te Manihera Chadwick in 1968, and the couple went on to have three children. After holding many roles in the health sector, including a term from 1976 to 1986 as union representative for the New Zealand Nurses Association, Steve Chadwick was elected to the Rotorua District Council in 1996.

Member of Parliament

In the 1999 election, Chadwick stood as the Labour Party candidate for the Rotorua seat, and defeated incumbent National Party MP Max Bradford. At the 2005 election she was narrowly returned to Parliament by 662 or 2.2% more votes than her opponent.

In 2006, Chadwick's Shop Trading Hours Act Repeal (Easter Trading) Amendment Bill was drawn from the member's ballot.  The bill passed its first reading and was sent to select committee, but was narrowly defeated at the second reading, 64 to 57.

In 2007, she was appointed to Cabinet as Minister of Conservation and Women's Affairs, as well as becoming an Associate Minister of Health.

In the 2008 general election, Chadwick lost her seat to National's Todd McClay, whose margin was over 5000. Chadwick's loss was predicted by some commentators due to boundary changes which incorporated more rural areas into the electorate. However, due to Chadwick's list place of 30 she was able to return to parliament.

In 2010, Chadwick attempted to introduce a bill to Parliament to partially liberalise abortion law. This bill was defeated at the caucus stage and was not brought before Parliament.

Chadwick failed to regain her seat in the 2011 election, losing to Todd McClay by a margin of more than 7,000 votes.  On 27 November 2011 she announced that she would be retiring from politics.

As a cabinet minister, Chadwick was entitled to the title of The Honourable and became The Hon. Mrs Stephanie (Steve) Chadwick which is a title she was granted for the rest of her life after leaving parliament.

Mayor of Rotorua
Chadwick contested the Rotorua mayoralty in the local elections of that year, challenging sitting mayor Kevin Winters. Chadwick defeated Winters and three other candidates, receiving more than 11,000 votes from a total 19,596 votes cast.

At the 2016 local-body elections, Chadwick again ran for mayor, defeating six other candidates, receiving 8,990 of a total 21,408 votes cast

Chadwick's husband, John Chadwick, died in Rotorua on 26 May 2017.

In 2020, Chadwick announced a zero percent rates increase in the Rotorua Lakes Council's 2020/2021 annual plan to cushion the financial blow of the COVID-19 pandemic, which had severely impacted the district's tourism industry.

Chadwick did not stand for re-election as mayor in the 2022 elections.

In the 2022 New Year Honours, Chadwick was appointed a Companion of the Queen's Service Order, for services to local government and as a Member of Parliament.

References

Further reading

External links
Parliamentary website page
Steve Chadwick's website

|-

|-

|-

|-

1948 births
Living people
New Zealand Labour Party MPs
Members of the Cabinet of New Zealand
Local politicians in New Zealand
New Zealand nurses
People from Hastings, New Zealand
People from Rotorua
Women government ministers of New Zealand
New Zealand list MPs
Unsuccessful candidates in the 2011 New Zealand general election
Members of the New Zealand House of Representatives
New Zealand MPs for North Island electorates
Mayors of Rotorua
People educated at Karamu High School
21st-century New Zealand politicians
21st-century New Zealand women politicians
Women members of the New Zealand House of Representatives
Companions of the Queen's Service Order